The 1882 Birthday Honours were appointments by Queen Victoria to various orders and honours to reward and highlight good works by citizens of the British Empire. The appointments were made to celebrate the official birthday of the Queen, and were published in The London Gazette on 23 May, 24 May  and 2 June 1882.

The recipients of honours are displayed here as they were styled before their new honour, and arranged by honour, with classes (Knight, Knight Grand Cross, etc.) and then divisions (Military, Civil, etc.) as appropriate.

United Kingdom and British Empire

Baronetcies
The Right Honourable John Whittaker Ellis, Lord Mayor of the City of London

The Most Honourable Order of the Bath

Knight Commander of the Order of the Bath (KCB)

Civil Division
James Caird  Senior Copyhold, Inclosure, and Tithe Commissioner
Ralph Wood Thompson  Undersecretary of State for the War Department

Companion of the Order of the Bath (CB)

Civil Division
Robert George Wyndham Herbert, Undersecretary of State for the Colonies
Charles Lennox Peel, Clerk of the Councils Colonel Thomas Inglis, of the Royal Engineers
Henry Jenkyns, Assistant Parliamentary Counsel

The Most Exalted Order of the Star of India

Knight Grand Commander (GCSI)
His Highness the Maharajah of Travancore
His Highness Nawab Ikbal-ud-dowlah of Oudh (Baghdad)

Knight Commander (KCSI)
The Maharajah Jotendro Mohun Tagore  
Lieutenant-Colonel Oliver Beauchamp Coventry St. John   Royal (late Bengal) Engineers, late Resident at Kandahar

Companion (CSI)

Lieutenant-Colonel Edward Charles Ross, Bombay Staff Corps, Political Resident in the Persian Gulf
William Hudleston, Madras Civil Service, Member of the Council of the Governor of Madras
Charles Paget Carmichael, Bengal Civil Service, Senior Member of the Board of Revenue, North Western Provinces
Edward Francis Harrison, late Bengal Civil Service, formerly Comptroller-General, Calcutta

The Most Distinguished Order of Saint Michael and Saint George

Knight Commander of the Order of St Michael and St George (KCMG)

Cornelius Hendricksen Kortright  late Governor of the Colony of British Guiana
William Brampton Gurdon  for services on Special Missions in 1879 and 1881 to South Africa for the Settlement of Financial Questions
Colonel William Bellairs  for services in South Africa
Colonel George Stoddart Whitmore  formerly Commandant of Local Forces in New Zealand, and Member of the Legislative Council of that Colony
Saul Samuel  Agent-General in London for New South Wales, and previously Member of several Administrations in that Colony 
Count Giorgio Serafino Ciantar (Paleologo), Barone di San Giovanni  President of the Assembly of the Maltese Nobility
John Hall, lately First Minister in New Zealand

Companion of the Order of St Michael and St George (CMG)

Alfred Patrick, lately Clerk of the House of Commons of the Dominion of Canada
Lieutenant-Colonel John Stoughton Dennis, late Deputy of the Minister of the Interior in the Dominion of Canada
Lieutenant-Colonel Francis Walter de Winton  Military Secretary to the Governor-General of Canada
Montague Frederick Ommanney, one of the Crown Agents for the Colonies
William Turner Thiselton-Dyer  Assistant Director of the Royal Botanic Gardens, Kew, for services rendered to Colonial Governments
Saverio Marchese di Piro, Major of the Royal Malta Fencible Artillery
Henry Heylyn Hayter, Government Statist in the Colony of Victoria
Cornelius Alfred Moloney, Colonial Secretary of the Gold Coast Colony
Gerhardus M. Rudolf, Resident Magistrate in Natal
Melmoth Osborn, British Resident in Zululand
John Forrest, Deputy Surveyor-General of Western Australia, for distinguished services in exploration
Victor Alexander Williamson, for special services in Mauritius and Fiji

The Most Eminent Order of the Indian Empire

Companion (CIE)
William Mackinnon
Syud Lutf Ali Khan
Moung Shway Kyee, Police Department, British Burmah
Rana Shankar Bakhsh Singh Bahadur, Honorary Assistant Commissioner in Oudh
Deputy Surgeon-General William James Moore, Honorary Surgeon to the Viceroy of India
Edward Ronald Douglas, Deputy Director-General of the Post Office of India

References

Birthday Honours
1882 awards
1882 in Australia
1882 in Canada
1882 in India
1882 in New Zealand
1882 in the United Kingdom